The 1997 UEFA European Under-16 Championship was the 15th edition of UEFA's European Under-16 Football Championship. Germany hosted the championship, during 28 April – 10 May 1997. 16 teams entered the competition, and Spain defeated Austria in the final to win the competition for the fourth time.

The games were held in Barsinghausen, Blankenburg, Braunschweig, Bremen, Bückeburg, Celle, Einbeck, Goslar, Hamburg, Hamelin, Hanover, Hettstedt, Hildesheim, Kiel, Lehrte, Lübeck, Lübtheen, Minden, Neukloster, Neustadt-Glewe, Nienburg/Weser, Norderstedt, Nordhausen, Polz, Rendsburg, Schönberg, Schwerin, Thale, Vöhrum and Wernigerode.

Squads

Participants

Group stage

Group A

Group B

Group C

Group D

Knockout stages

Quarterfinals

Semifinals

Third Place Playoff

Final

References
RSSSF.com
UEFA.com

1997
UEFA
Under
1997
April 1997 sports events in Europe
May 1997 sports events in Europe
1997 in youth association football